Wilkinson Street is a tram stop on Nottingham Express Transit (NET), in the city of Nottingham suburb of Basford. The tram stop opened on 9 March 2004, along with NET's initial system. It is one of several park and ride stops on the NET network, with more than 600 car parking spaces located next to the stop. NET's Wilkinson Street depot is also adjacent to the stop, and provides storage and maintenance facilities for all the system's trams, having been expanded to cope with the additional trams ordered for phase two. The depot also contains NET's offices, staff facilities and control room.

The tram stop is located on reserved track alongside Wilkinson Street and has two side platforms flanking a pair of tracks. To the west, the tracks cross over the Robin Hood railway line on a bridge shared with Wilkinson Street, and then curve and descend to run parallel with the railway to Basford stop. To the east of the stop, there is a triangular junction that gives access to the depot, and the two tracks then cross each other and run separately in two different street alignments. Trams heading towards the city centre next call at Radford Road stop, whilst trams coming from the city centre do so via Shipstone Street stop.

With the opening of NET's phase two, Wilkinson Street is now on the common section of the NET, where line 1, between Hucknall and Chilwell, and line 2, between Phoenix Park and Clifton, operate together. Trams on each line run at frequencies that vary between 4 and 8 trams per hour, depending on the day and time of day, combining to provide up to 16 trams per hour on the common section.

Gallery

References

External links

Nottingham Express Transit stops